Bruno Manuel Rodrigues Silva (born 5 August 1982), known as Bruno China, is a Portuguese former footballer who played as a defensive midfielder, currently a manager.

He spent most of his career with Leixões, representing the club in all three major levels of Portuguese football. He appeared in 150 Primeira Liga matches over eight seasons, and also competed professionally in Spain.

Playing career
China, a youth product of Leixões S.C. that was born in Matosinhos, participated in the club's promotion from the third division into the Primeira Liga. He made his debut in the latter competition on 18 August 2007, on the first day of the season against S.L. Benfica (1–1 home draw), and only missed one game as the side retained their league status.

In late August 2009, after extensive negotiations, China joined Spain's RCD Mallorca on a three-year contract, even though manager Gregorio Manzano opposed his signing. He made his La Liga debut on 13 September, playing the last five minutes of a 1–1 draw at Villarreal CF, and appeared rarely throughout the campaign as the Balearic Islands team finished fifth and qualified for the UEFA Europa League.

China was released from contract in August 2010, returning to his country shortly after with Rio Ave FC. He continued competing in the top flight the following years, representing Académica de Coimbra and C.F. Os Belenenses.

In late December 2015, the 33-year-old China returned to Leixões. He retired three years later, after as many second-tier seasons.

Coaching career
China worked as an assistant manager at his last club. He was the side's interim manager for one game after the dismissal of Carlos Pinto in January 2020, leaving the under-23 side and the Estádio do Mar altogether after not being retained.

On 7 January 2021, China was appointed head coach at S.C. Espinho in the third tier. In the ensuing summer, he joined F.C. Felgueiras 1932 in the same league.

References

External links

1982 births
Living people
Sportspeople from Matosinhos
Portuguese footballers
Association football midfielders
Primeira Liga players
Liga Portugal 2 players
Segunda Divisão players
Leixões S.C. players
Rio Ave F.C. players
Associação Académica de Coimbra – O.A.F. players
C.F. Os Belenenses players
La Liga players
RCD Mallorca players
Portuguese expatriate footballers
Expatriate footballers in Spain
Portuguese expatriate sportspeople in Spain
Portuguese football managers
Liga Portugal 2 managers
Leixões S.C. managers
C.D. Trofense managers